Li Si (BCSeptember or October 208 BC) was a Chinese calligrapher, philosopher, and politician of the Qin dynasty. He served as Chancellor (or Prime Minister) from 246 to 208 BC under two rulers: Qin Shi Huang, the king of the Qin state and later the First Emperor of the Qin dynasty; and Qin Er Shi, Qin Shi Huang's eighteenth son and the Second Emperor. Concerning administrative methods, Li Si "indicated that he admired and utilized the ideas of Shen Buhai", repeatedly referring to the technique of Shen Buhai and Han Fei, but regarding law followed Shang Yang.

John Knoblock, a translator of classical Chinese texts, considered Li Si "one of the two or three most important figures in Chinese history"; Li Si assisted the Emperor Shi Huangdi in unifying the laws, governmental ordinances, weights and measures, and standardized chariots, carts, and the characters used in writing... [facilitating] the cultural unification of China. He "created a government based solely on merit, so that in the empire sons and younger brothers in the imperial clan were not ennobled, but meritorious ministers were", and "pacified the frontier regions by subduing the barbarians to the north and south". He had the weapons of the feudal states melted and cast into musical bells and large human statues, and relaxed taxes and the draconian punishments inherited from Shang Yang.

Early life 
Li Si was originally from Shang Cai in the State of Chu. As a young man he was a minor functionary in the local administration of Chu. According to the Records of the Great Historian, one day Li Si observed that rats in the outhouse were dirty and hungry but the rats in the barn house were well fed. He suddenly realized that "there is no set standard for honour since everyone's life is different.  The values of people are determined by their social status.  And like rats, people's social status often depends purely on the random life events around them.  And so instead of always being restricted by moral codes, people should do what they deemed best at the moment." He made up his mind to take up politics as a career, which was a common choice for scholars not from a noble family during the Warring States period.

Li Si was unable to advance his career in Chu.  He believed that achieving nothing in life while being so intelligent and educated would bring shame to not just himself but to all scholars.  After having finished his education with the famous Confucian thinker Xunzi, he moved to the State of Qin, the most powerful state at that time in an attempt to advance his political career.

Career in Qin 
During his stay in Qin, Li Si became a guest of Prime Minister Lü Buwei and got the chance to talk to Ying Zheng, who would later become the first emperor of a unified China, Qin Shi Huang. Li Si expressed that the Qin state was extremely powerful, but uniting China was still impossible if all of the other six states united to fight against Qin.  Qin Shi Huang was impressed by Li Si's view of how to unify China. Having adopted Li Si's proposal, the ruler of Qin spent generously to lure intellectuals to the state of Qin and sent out assassins to kill important scholars in other states.

In 237 BC a clique at the Qin court urged King Zheng to expel all foreigners from the state to prevent espionage. As a native of Chu, Li Si would be a target of the policy so he memorialised the king explaining the many benefits of foreigners to Qin including "the sultry girls of Zhao." The king relented and, impressed with Li Si's rhetoric, promoted him. The same year, Li Si is reported to have urged King Zheng to annex the neighbouring State of Han to order to intimidate the other five remaining states. Li Si also wrote the "Petition against the Expulsion of Guest Officers" (Jianzhuke Shu) in 234 BC. Han Fei, a member of the aristocracy from the State of Han, was asked by the Han king to go to Qin and resolve the situation through diplomacy. Li Si, who envied Han Fei's intellect, persuaded the Qin king that he could neither send Han Fei back (as his superior ability would be a threat to Qin) nor employ him (as his loyalty would not be to Qin). As a result, Han Fei was imprisoned, and in 233 BC convinced by Li Si to commit suicide by taking poison. The State of Han was later conquered in 230 BC.

After Qin Shi Huang became emperor Li Si persuaded him to suppress intellectual dissent. Li Si believed that books regarding things such as medicine, agriculture and prophecy could be ignored but political books were dangerous in public hands.  It was hard to make progress and change the country with the opposition of so many "free thinking" scholars.  As a result, only the state should keep political books, and only the state run schools should be allowed to educate political scholars. Li Si himself penned the edict ordering the destruction of historical records and literature in 213 BC, including key Confucian texts, which he thought detrimental to the welfare of the state.  It is commonly thought that 460 Confucian scholars were buried alive in the well-known historical event "Burning Books and Burying Confucianists".

Death 
When Qin Shi Huang died while away from the capital, Li Si and the chief eunuch Zhao Gao suppressed the late emperor's choice of successor, which was Fusu. At that time Fusu was close friends with Meng Tian.  If Fusu became the next emperor there was a high chance Meng Tian would replace Li Si as prime minister.  Fearing a loss of power, Li Si decided to betray the dead Qin Shi Huang.  Li Si and Zhao Gao tricked Fusu into committing suicide, and installed another prince, Qin Er Shi (229 BC – 207 BC), in his place. During the tumultuous aftermath, Zhao Gao convinced the new emperor to install his followers in official positions. When his power base was secure enough, Zhao Gao betrayed Li Si and charged him with treason.  Qin Er Shi, who viewed Zhao Gao as his teacher, did not question his decision.  Zhao Gao had Li Si tortured until he admitted the crime and once even intercepted a letter of pleas he had sent to the Emperor. In 208 BC, Zhao Gao had Li Si subjected to the Five Punishments and executed via waist chop at a public market and also had his entire family to the third degree exterminated. Sima Qian records Li Si's last words to his son as having been, "I wish that you and I could take our brown dog and go out through the eastern gate of Shang Cai to chase the crafty hare. But how could we do that!"

Legacy
Believing in a highly bureaucratic system, Li Si was central to the efficiency of the state of Qin and the success of its military conquest. He was also instrumental in systematizing standard measures and currency in post-unified China.  He further helped systematize the written Chinese language by promulgating as the imperial standard the small seal script which had already been in use in the state of Qin.  In this process, variant glyphs within the Qin script were proscribed, as were variant scripts from the different regions which had been conquered. This had a unifying effect on the Chinese culture for thousands of years. Li Si was also the author of the Cangjiepian, the first Chinese language primer of which fragments still exist.

In popular culture 
 Li Si is mentioned in Elias Canetti's novel Auto-da-fe (1935).
 Li Si is one of the 32 historical figures who appear as special characters in the video game Romance of the Three Kingdoms XI by Koei. He also appears as a special character in Romance of the Three Kingdoms XIV.
  appears a character in Yasuhisa Hara's popular manga Kingdom as one of Lu Buwei's Four Pillars, alongside Lord Changping and Meng Wu. Imprisoned after Lu Buwei's disgrace after being conspirator in Ai's failed invasion, defected to Ying Zheng and became a Legalist lawmaker.
 "The Five Pains of Li Si" appears in The Venture Bros. Season 05 Episode 07, first on a "torture token", then on the "wheel of torture." 
 Li Si is a key character in the 74-episode series The Qin Empire IV and a minor character in the 80 episode series The King's War, also known as The Legend of Chu and Han.

See also 
 Burning of books and burying of scholars

Notes

References

Further reading 
 
 Goldin, Paul R. (2005). "Li Si, Chancellor of the Universe". In After Confucius: Studies in Early Chinese Philosophy, pp. 66–75. Honolulu: University of Hawaii Press.
 Levi, Jean (1993). "Han fei tzu (韓非子)". In Loewe, Michael (ed., 1993). Early Chinese Texts: A Bibliographical Guide, pp. 115–116. (Early China Special Monograph Series No. 2), Society for the Study of Early China, and the Institute of East Asian Studies, University of California, Berkeley, .
 Michael, Franz (1986). China through the Ages: History of a Civilization. pp. 53–67. Westview Press; SMC Publishing, Inc. Taipei. ; 957-638-190-8 (ppbk).
 Nivison, David S. (1999). "The Classical Philosophical Writings", pp. 745–812. In Loewe, Michael & Shaughnessy, Edward L. The Cambridge History of Ancient China: From the Origins of Civilization to 221 BC. Cambridge University Press.
 Yap, Joseph P. (2009). Wars With The Xiongnu, A Translation from Zizhi tongjian. AuthorHouse, Bloomington, Indiana, U.S.A. . Chapter 1.

280s BC births
208 BC deaths
3rd-century BC Chinese philosophers
Chinese chancellors
Executed Qin dynasty people
Heads of government who were later imprisoned
History of the Chinese script
Inventors killed by their own invention
Legalism (Chinese philosophy)
Qin dynasty calligraphers
Qin dynasty philosophers
Qin dynasty politicians
Qin Shi Huang
People executed by cutting in half
Philosophers from Henan
Philosophers of law
Politicians from Zhumadian
Victims of familial execution
Zhou dynasty philosophers
Zhou dynasty politicians